Sebastian Gregory (born 3 March 1990) is an Australian actor and musician. He is a self-taught guitarist, drummer and songwriter, who formed a band called Menace when he was thirteen. After being spotted in his own music video, Gregory was signed to an acting management agency. He has appeared in a number of short films, commercials and theatre productions. He made his first television appearance in a 2004 episode of Blue Heelers. Two years later he landed a recurring role in the soap opera Neighbours. Gregory made his feature film debut in Acolytes. This was followed by a role in 2009 film Beautiful and a regular role in children's television series The Elephant Princess. Gregory's next film roles were in comedy films Accidents Happen and A Heartbeat Away. In April 2012, Gregory joined the cast of Neighbours for a second time.

Early life
Gregory was born in Melbourne, Australia in the early 1990s. He was given a drum kit when he was ten years old and he made the first of his guest appearances at hotels and clubs when he was eleven. Gregory is a self-taught guitarist, drummer and songwriter. He formed a band called Menace when he was thirteen. The band was later taken to London by Xenomania and they were offered a recording contract. Gregory's acting talent was discovered after he was spotted in his own music video. He was then signed to an acting management agency.

Career
Gregory has appeared in a number of short films, commercials, theatre, television productions and films. In 2004, he appeared as Rohan Shanley in an episode of Blue Heelers. Two years later Gregory landed a recurring role in the long-running soap opera Neighbours. He played Garrett Burns, a love interest for Rachel Kinski (Caitlin Stasey).

Gregory made his feature film debut in Jon Hewitt's Acolytes. He played Mark, a teenager who becomes involved in murder and violence. Principal photography on the film began in April 2007 in Queensland. Gregory's band, Menace, had two songs featured on the soundtrack. Shortly after, Gregory was cast in Beautiful a film by writer-director Dean O'Flaherty. Of his role as Danny in the film, Gregory told Sacha Molitorisz of The Sydney Morning Herald "I always seem to be playing a weird, freaky kid. But there's something really beautiful about Danny." Molitorisz said Gregory "delivers a powerfully understated performance in the film." For his portrayal of Danny, Gregory earned a nomination for Best Young Actor at the 2009 Australian Film Institute Awards.

Gregory was cast in the regular role of JB Deekes in the children's television series The Elephant Princess in 2008. His Menace bandmates made a cameo appearance in episode seven of The Elephant Princess and one of their tracks was also featured. In June 2008, a writer for Variety reported Gregory had joined the cast of Accidents Happen, a dark comedy film based on a semi-autobiographical screenplay by Brian Carbee. Gregory auditioned for the role of Billy, but the filmmakers thought he would be perfect for the role of Doug Post instead. Accidents Happen was shot in Sydney and released in 2009.

Gregory's next film role came about in 2011 when he starred in A Heartbeat Away, an Australian musical comedy. On 10 April 2012, it was announced Gregory had joined the cast of Neighbours again as  "mathematics genius" Ed Lee. He had a four-month guest contract with the soap and began appearing from 8 June 2012. Gregory filmed a role in Return to Nim's Island in the Gold Coast during August 2012.

Filmography

Film

Television

References

External links
 

1990 births
Living people
Australian male television actors
Male actors from Melbourne
21st-century Australian male actors